Treacherous Orchestra are a Scottish 12-piece Celtic fusion band. The band blends Scottish traditional music with other influences such as folk, rock and punk.  Instruments used include bagpipes, accordion, bodhrán, fiddle and tin whistle as well as guitars, bass and drums. The Guardian described them as "a Scottish folk big band, celebrated for their furious live performances and impressive musicianship".  They first played together at Celtic Connections in 2009, and were nominated for the Scottish Album of the Year awards in 2015.

Albums
The band have released two full-length albums.
 Origins (2012)
 Grind (2015)

References

Musical groups from Glasgow
Celtic fusion groups